The Marone Family is a family in the CBS Daytime soap opera The Bold and the Beautiful. They are and have been involved in running the fashion house Forrester Creations but the core of their business interests is the ownership and management of the international shipping company Marone Industries.

Family members

First generation
Massimo Marone IV (Joseph Mascolo)Patriarch of the Marone family. Founder, owner and former Chairman and CEO of Marone Industries, an international shipping company. Father of Ridge Forrester, Dominick Marone and Diana Carter.

Second generation
Ridge Forrester (Thorsten Kaye)Son of Massimo Marone and Stephanie Forrester but raised by his mother's husband Eric Forrester. Father to Thomas, Phoebe, Steffy and Ridge Forrester Jr. Former Vice Chairman of Marone Industries. He is currently co-owner and co-CEO of Forrester Creations.
Dominick "Nick" Marone (Jack Wagner)Son of Massimo Marone and Jackie Marone. He is the father of Jack Marone and Nicole Marone. Former sea captain, president and partner in Jackie M Designs, former owner and CEO of Forrester Creations, and former CEO of Marone Industries.
Diana Carter Daughter of Massimo Marone and Sheila Carter.

Third generation
Thomas Forrester (Matthew Atkinson)Son of Ridge and Taylor Hamilton. Formerly CEO of Forrester Creations and currently working at Forrester International. Father of Douglas Forrester.
Steffy Forrester (Jacqueline MacInnes Wood)Daughter of Ridge and Taylor Hamilton. Twin sister of Phoebe Forrester. Mother of Kelly Spencer and Hayes Finnegan. She is a co-owner and co-CEO of Forrester Creations.
 Phoebe Forrester (MacKenzie Mauzy)Daughter of Ridge and Taylor Hamilton. Twin sister of Steffy Forrester. She died in December 2008 in a terrible car wreck driven by Rick Forrester.
Ridge "RJ" Forrester Jr. (Anthony Turpel) Son of Ridge and Brooke Logan. Originally thought to be Nick's son, which set off a war between brothers Ridge and Nick.
Jack Marone  Son of Nick and Brooke Logan. Carried by Taylor Hamilton via in vitro fertilization.
Nicole MaroneDaughter of Nick and Bridget Forrester, stillborn in 2006.

Fourth generation
 Douglas Forrester  Son of Thomas and Caroline Spencer. Caroline was married to Ridge, but he told her that he couldn't be the father. They kept up the pretense that Ridge was the father until Thomas found out. Caroline didn't want to reveal Douglas' paternity, but Ridge gave Douglas to Thomas, letting them be a family. After Caroline's death, Douglas was legally adopted by Hope Logan.
 Kelly Spencer  Daughter of Steffy and Liam Spencer, born June 4, 2018.
 Hayes Finnegan  Son of Steffy and John "Finn" Finnegan, born July 1, 2021.

In-Laws
 Jacqueline Payne Marone (Lesley-Anne Down) - Massimo's wife (2003–04), mother of Nick
 Caroline Spencer Sr. (Joanna Johnson) - Ridge's wife (1990).
 Taylor Hayes (Krista Allen) - Ridge's wife (1992–95, 1998–2006); Nick's wife (2007–08); mother of Thomas, Steffy and Phoebe
 Brooke Logan (Katherine Kelly Lang) - Ridge's wife (1994–95, 1998, 2003–04, 2004–05, 2009, 2009–11, 2012, 2018–22); Nick's wife (2006–07); mother of RJ and Jack.
 Bridget Forrester (Ashley Jones) - Nick's wife (2005–06, 2008, 2009–10), mother of Nicole
 Gabriela Moreno (Shanelle Workman) - Thomas' wife (2005–06).
 Liam Spencer (Scott Clifton) - Steffy's husband (2011–12, 2013, 2017–18), father of Aspen and Kelly.
 Caroline Spencer (Linsey Godfrey) - Ridge's wife (2015–16), mother of Douglas
 Wyatt Spencer (Darin Brooks) - Steffy's husband (2016–17)
 Hope Logan (Annika Noelle) - Thomas's wife (2019), adoptive mother of Douglas.
 John Finnegan (Tanner Novlan) - Steffy's husband (2021—), father of Hayes.

Marone Industries
Marone Industries is an international shipping company that was founded by Massimo Marone who ran it with an iron fist for decades and Marone Industries became known as a very conservative company. When it was revealed that Ridge Forrester was Massimo's son Ridge became Vice Chairman of the Marone Industries and added fashion house Spectra Fashions as a subsidiary but Massimo eventually sold it back to Sally Spectra. Ridge eventually returned to Forrester Creations but remained on the Marone board until Massimo's other son Dominick Marone became more involved with the company. Nick eventually double crossed his father and forced the Marone board to remove Massimo as CEO and make him the new CEO. Nick used Marone Industries to buy Forrester Creations but after it was revealed that Nick's mother and Massimo's ex-wife Jacqueline Payne Marone was a prostitute the Marone board fired Nick as CEO but did sell him Forrester Creations. Nick sold his stock in Marone Industries to board member George Septolino, who presumably took over as CEO.

Marone Industries also has interests in industries other than shipping. It was revealed that this includes banking and real estate when Massimo was able to check the bank account records of Mark Maclaine to prove that Stephanie bribed him to help her fake a heart attack in order to break up Ridge's marriage to Brooke. Mark Maclaine revealed that his apartment complex was owned by Marone Industries.

Massimo is still a major shareholder in Marone Industries. It is not known to what extent Ridge has in the company but as Massimo's eldest son, chosen heir in Massimo's will, and former Vice Chairman Ridge is thought to have some association with Marone Industries.

Personnel
 Massimo Marone (Founder, former Chairman and CEO, majority shareholder) 
 George Satalino (Patrick John Hurley) (board member, possible CEO)

Former Employees
 Ridge Forrester (Vice Chairman)
 Nick Marone (CEO, shareholder, sea captain)

Family Tree

{{Tree chart| | | |!|WS3 |y|SF2 |y|JFF | | | |WS3=Liam Spencer|SF2=Steffy Forrester|JFF=John Finnegan}}

Descendants

 Massimo Marone III (deceased); son of Massimo Marone, Jr; married Unnamed woman (deceased)
 Massimo Marone IV; Son of Massimo III; married Jackie Payne (2003–04)
 Ridge Forrester (1957–); Massimo's son with Stephanie Forrester; married Caroline Spencer (1990), Taylor Hayes (1992–95, 1998–2006), Brooke Logan (1994–95, 1998, 2003–04, 2004–05, 2009, 2009–11, 2012, 2018–22), Caroline Spencer (2015–16)
 Thomas Forrester (1986–); Ridge and Taylor's son; married Gabriela Moreno (2005), Hope Logan (2019)
 Douglas Forrester (2016–); Thomas's son with Caroline Spencer, adopted by Hope
 Steffy Forrester (1989–); Ridge and Taylor's daughter; married Liam Spencer (2011–12, 2013, 2017–18), Wyatt Spencer (2016–17), John "Finn" Finnegan (2021–)
Kelly Spencer (2018–); Steffy and Liam's daughter
Hayes Finnegan (2021–); Steffy and Finn's son
 Phoebe Forrester (1989–2008); Ridge and Taylor's daughter
 R.J. Forrester (2000–); Ridge and Brooke's son
 Nick Marone; Massimo and Jackie's son; married Bridget Forrester (2005–06, 2008, 2009–10), Brooke Logan (2006–07), Taylor Hayes (2007–08)
 Nicole Marone (2006); Nick and Bridget's daughter
 Jack Marone (2007–); Nick and Brooke's son, carried by Taylor
 Diana Carter (c2002–); Massimo's daughter with Sheila Carter.
 Unnamed man''; son of Massimo III; married Unnamed woman 
 Oscar Marone; Massimo's nephew

Notes

References

External links 

The Bold and the Beautiful families